Signal Hill (Maori: Te Pahuri o te Rangipohika) is a prominent landform in the city of Dunedin, New Zealand. It is located close to, and due north of, the head of the Otago Harbour and reaches an elevation of 393 m (1289 ft). The suburbs Ravensbourne, St. Leonards, and Opoho lie on its southern, eastern, and northwestern flanks, respectively. To the northwest is North East Valley, the thalweg of Lindsay Creek, a tributary of the Water of Leith. The southernmost spur of Signal Hill, Logan Point, has been extensively quarried for road gravel. State Highway 88 skirts the foot of the hill close to the edge of the Otago Harbour.

A secondary summit of the hill (height 329 m) is capped by a monument to the New Zealand Centennial of 1940, a large structure including two large bronze figures representing "History" and "The Thread of Life" designed by F. W. Sturrock and F. W. Staub. Although commissioned for the centenary of the signing of the Treaty of Waitangi, the monument was not constructed until the 1950s, owing to the enforced strictures of World War II.  A large stone from Edinburgh in Scotland is also incorporated in the monument, symbolising the ties between Dunedin and its sister city.

The monument is surrounded by a scenic reserve 180 hectares in extent. This park was inaugurated as a much smaller park in 1926, and has gradually been extended to its current size. The reserve, located only five kilometres from central Dunedin, is a popular site for both locals and visitors, and affords an excellent panoramic view over the city.

In October 2006, a series of bush fires caused extensive damage to the plantations of forest which cover the western slopes of the hill.

References

Bishop, G. & Hamel, A. (1993).  From Sea to Silver Peaks. Dunedin: John McIndoe.
Herd, J. & Griffiths, G. J. (1980).  Discovering Dunedin. Dunedin: John McIndoe.

Hills of Otago
Geography of Dunedin
Protected areas of Otago
Tourist attractions in Dunedin
Urban forests in New Zealand